Jon Fish (born June 22, 1962) is an American rowing coxswain. He competed in the men's coxed pair event at the 1988 Summer Olympics.

References

External links
 

1962 births
Living people
American male rowers
Olympic rowers of the United States
Rowers at the 1988 Summer Olympics
Sportspeople from New York City
Pan American Games medalists in rowing
Pan American Games silver medalists for the United States
Rowers at the 1991 Pan American Games
Coxswains (rowing)